Below are the squads for the Football at the 1995 All-Africa Games, hosted by Harare, Zimbabwe, and which took place between 12 and 22 September 1995.

Group A

Congo

Egypt

Zambia

Zimbabwe

Group B

Algeria
Head coach:

Guinea

NIGERIA

Mauritius

External links
Football VI All Africa Games - Harare 1995 - todor66.com

Squads
African Games football squads